General elections were held in Sweden on 19 September 1976. Results were published by the Statistical Central Bureau.

National results

Results by region

Percentage share

By votes

Results by constituency

Percentage share

By votes

Municipal summary

Results by municipality

The listing of the results have been made with the 21st-century county mergers in mind to enable consistency. As a result, the Scanian and West Gothian constituencies that were in separate counties as of 1973 have been listed under their current counties, although the names of the original constituency from 1976 are included. "Share" denotes how large a share of the constituency each municipality had as well as the share of the national vote of 5,168,996 held by the overall constituency.

Counties not in accordance with provinces include the three Småland counties of Jönköping, Kalmar (including Öland) and Kronoberg. From an enlarged perspective, the three provinces of Västergötland, Bohuslän and Dalsland form Västra Götaland. In 1976 those consisted of three separate counties, namely, Bohuslän, Skaraborg and Älvsborg. Skåne County did not exist in 1976 either, with the province divided between Kristianstad County in the north and Malmöhus County in the south. Örebro County is divided between three separate provinces centered around Närke. As a result, Västmanland County is smaller than the province. Stockholm County is also consisting part of the provinces of Södermanland and Uppland, the latter of which forms Uppsala County in its north. Farther north, Gävleborg is a merger between Gästrikland and Hälsingland, Västernorrland consists of Medelpad and Ångermanland, whereas Lapland is divided between Västerbotten and Norrbotten counties. Härjedalen is a single municipality roughly corresponding with the provincial borders, merged into Jämtland County.

Blekinge

Dalarna
Kopparberg County

Gotland

Gävleborg

Halland

Jämtland

Jönköping

Kalmar

Kronoberg

Norrbotten

Skåne

Kristianstad County

Malmö area
Four-city constituency

Malmöhus County

Stockholm

Stockholm (city)

Stockholm County

Södermanland

Uppsala

Värmland

Västerbotten

Västernorrland

Västmanland

Västra Götaland

Bohuslän

Gothenburg

Skaraborg

Älvsborg N

Älvsborg S

Örebro
The leftist bloc won Askersund by seven votes margin with 3,788 versus 3,781 votes, although both blocs' results were rounded to 48.6%.

Östergötland

References

General elections in Sweden